Huaxi is a town of Huayin, Shaanxi, China. , it has one residential community and nine villages under its administration.

References

Township-level divisions of Shaanxi
Huayin